Corvus Energy is a Norwegian supplier for zero-emission and hybrid maritime, offshore, subsea and port applications. The company was founded in Canada in 2009. The head office was moved to Norway in 2018. Corvus Energy offers Energy Storage Systems (ESS) suitable for various vessel types, providing energy storage in the form of modular lithium-ion battery systems. The battery systems provide power to hybrid and all-electric heavy industrial equipment, including large marine propulsion drives. In addition, Corvus Energy develops maritime fuel cells in partnership with Toyota. Corvus Energy has manufacturing and engineering in Porsgrunn, in Bergen, Norway, and in Richmond, British Columbia. In January 2023, Corvus opened a maritime battery manufacturing plant in Fairhaven,Washington. The company has a global sales and service network in addition to a Joint Venture with Sumitomo in Japan.

References 

- The Economist, Oct. 2010 (Beefier Batteries: Monster Power Start to Take on the Big Stuff)

- Financial Post, Feb 2011 (It Ain't Easy Being Green)

- The Globe & Mail, April 2012 (A Burst of Innovation on the Calgary Tarmac)

- Maritime Reporter, Sept 2012 (The Corvus Power Play)

- Maritime battery manufacturer opens new US factory, February 2023

Battery manufacturers